Alla breve also known as cut time or cut common timeis a musical meter notated by the time signature symbol  (a C with a vertical line through it), which is the equivalent of . The term is Italian for "on the breve", originally meaning that the beat was counted on the breve.

Alla breve is a "simple-duple meter with a half-note pulse".  The note denomination that represents one beat is the minim or half-note.  There are two of these per bar, so that the time signature  may be interpreted as "two minim beats per bar". Alternatively this is read as two beats per measure, where the half note gets the beat.

Modern usage
In contemporary use, alla breve suggests a fairly quick tempo. Thus, it is used frequently for military marches. From about 1600 to 1900, its meaning with regard to tempo varied, so it cannot always be taken to mean a quick tempo.  Using alla breve helps the musician read notes of short duration more cleanly with fewer beats.

Historical usage
Prior to 1600 the term alla breve derives from the system of mensural or proportional notation (also called proportio dupla) in which note values (and their graphical shapes) were related by the ratio 2:1. In this context it means that the tactus or metrical pulse (now commonly referred to as the "beat") is switched from its normal place on the whole note (semibreve) to the double whole note (breve).

Early music notation was developed by religious orders, which has resulted in some religious associations in notation. The most obvious is that music in triple time was called tempus perfectum, deriving its name from the Holy Trinity and represented by the "perfect" circle, which has no beginning or end.

Music in duple time was similarly called tempus imperfectum. Its symbol was the broken circle, which is still usedalthough it has evolved to mean , or "common time", today. When cut through by a vertical line "" , it means "cut common", or alla breve.

The use of the vertical line or stroke in a musical graphical symbol, as practiced in the Middle Ages and the Renaissance, and now referred to by the modern term of "cut time", did not always have the same meaning as alla breve. It sometimes had other functions, including non-mensural ones.

Example

Notes

Sources
 Randel, Don Michael (2003). Harvard dictionary of music, fourth edition. Cambridge, Massachusetts: The Belknap Press of Harvard University Press. .
 Sadie, Stanley; John Tyrrell, eds. (2001). The New Grove Dictionary of Music and Musicians, 2nd edition. New York: Grove's Dictionaries. .
 Novello, John (1986). The Contemporary Keyboardist, Hal Leonard Corporation, .

Musical notation
Patterns
Rhythm and meter